Edward Miller is an American actor, playwright, and producer. Several of his original plays have been produced off-Broadway, and he has appeared in a number of independent films. He has most often collaborated with filmmaker Casper Andreas. Miller appeared in and executive-produced Andreas'  2009 film The Big Gay Musical.

Early life and education
Miller is originally from Memphis, Tennessee. He attended the University of Memphis and studied music education.

Career
Miller has appeared in several New York off-Broadway theater productions, as well as films.

Filmography
A Four Letter Word (2008) Hot guy outside bar
The Big Gay Musical (2009) Stage manager
Kiss Me, Kill Me (2015) Bar patron/paramedic

Theater
Crossover, (Morton) 2003 Jan Hus Playhouse
Revolution Row, (Terrence) 2005 Sande Shurin Theatre
Make It So, 2008 Theater For the New City
A Promise Best Kept, 2012 Theater For the New City
No Ransom To Be Paid, 2017 Pangea Supper Club

Other projects
Miller also executive-produced an original musical by Erik Ransom entitled More Than All the World in 2016. It premiered at Theater for the New City.

References

External links
 

Living people
20th-century American dramatists and playwrights
Male actors from Memphis, Tennessee
21st-century American male actors
Writers from Memphis, Tennessee
21st-century American dramatists and playwrights
American male dramatists and playwrights
21st-century American male writers
Year of birth missing (living people)
20th-century American male writers